Richard Eaton may refer to:

 Richard Eaton, the founder of a choir which became the Richard Eaton Singers
 Richard K. Eaton (born 1948), judge for the United States Court of International Trade
 Richard Jefferson Eaton (1806–1847), British politician
 Ric Eaton (born 1962), American Olympic weightlifter
 Richard M. Eaton, American historian